Zunfthaus Zur Saffran (the guild house of the spice traders; Saffran means saffron) is a historically significant building in Zürich, Switzerland. It is located along the Limmatquai promenade between Münsterbrücke and Rathausbrücke. It is close to the Kämbel, Zimmerleuten and Rüden guild houses. The building is listed in the Swiss inventory of cultural property of national and regional significance as a major object of regional importance.

History 
The guild house's earliest recorded history dates back to 1383, when 18 individuals bought a building on the land where it now stands. Five buildings preceded the current building. Construction began on the current building between 1719 and 1723. The historical American Van Leer family traces their roots to ancestors who were members of the Saffran guild.

The current building is situated on the Limmat River's right bank in the immediate neighborhood of the Grossmünster church, the Rathaus, Zürich, and the Haus Zum Rüden. The building exhibits typical architectural features from its era such as its facade, which includes cornices and columns. In the mid-19th-century, the building was also used as an improvised post office.

The latest renovation was completed in 1995. The big guild hall on the first floor, the small guild hall, and the White Rose hall on the second floor are available for visiting. The guild house is referenced in the book Das Zürcher Zunftwesen by Markus Brühlmeier and Beat Frei.

Currently, as of January 11, 2016, the building serves as a dinner hall and is open Sunday through Saturday from 7 A.M. to 12 P.M. local time.

Details 
 Maximum Capacity: 250 
 Distance to Zürich Main Station: 700 m 
 Travel time from Zürich Main Station (public transport): 8 minutes 
 Travel time from Zürich Airport (public transport): 25 minutes

References

External links 

  

Altstadt (Zürich)
Guild houses in Zürich
Cultural property of regional significance in the canton of Zürich
Restaurants in Zürich
Buildings and structures completed in 1732
18th-century architecture in Switzerland